Attacus paukstadtorum is a moth in the family Saturniidae. It is found on Lombok in Indonesia.

References 

Saturniidae
Moths described in 2010
Moths of Indonesia